Obatala is a genus of African tangled nest spiders containing the single species, Obatala armata. It was  first described by Pekka T. Lehtinen in 1967, and has only been found in South Africa.

References

Amaurobiidae
Spiders of South Africa
Spiders described in 1967
Taxa named by Pekka T. Lehtinen